The International Council for Philosophy and Humanistic Studies (French: Conseil international de la philosophie et des sciences humaines; ICPHS/CIPSH) is a non-governmental organization within UNESCO. It embraces hundreds of learned societies in the field of philosophy, human sciences and related subjects.

History 
CIPSH was founded at a first General Assembly held in January 1949 upon suggestion by Sir Julian Huxley, the first Director-General of UNESCO. The first president was Jacques Rueff.

Members

Officers 
The officers of CIPSH are Luiz Oosterbeek (President), Catherine Jami (Vice President), Luisa Migliorati (Vice President), Margaret Higonnet (Treasurer), 
Hsiung Ping-Chen (Secretary General), Tim Jensen (Assistant Secretary General), and Chao Gejin (Past President). Former officers include
Rosalind Hackett (Vice President, 2017–2020) and Adama Samassékou (Past President, 2017–2020).

Publications 
The ICPHS publishes the journal Diogène/Diogenes in French and English. It was founded in 1952 by Roger Caillois. For many years, Jean d'Ormesson was the Editor-in-Chief. Current Editors-in-Chief are Maurice Aymard and Luca Scarantino.

Since the dawn of human civilization, philosophy and the humanities serve to enhance the understanding of goodness and truth, supporting the foundations for peace and the common good.

References

UNESCO
Philosophy organizations
International learned societies
Human sciences